Paul Krewer (10 June 1906 – 2000) was a German professional cyclist who won two silver and one bronze medals at the UCI Motor-paced World Championships in 1927, 1929 and 1934.

After attending a school in Duisburg, he moved to Cologne to work at his father's bicycle shop. There, aged 16, he started biking. In 1926 he turned professional and by then was a top German cyclist. In 1927 he won his first medal at the world championships riding with pacer Christian Junggeburth. In 1929 while driving in a car in Bonn they crashed into a tram. Junggeburth was seriously injured and died several days later in a hospital of blood poisoning.

Krewer died aged 94, nearly forgotten in Cologne. His elder brother Hans was also a cyclist. He died of appendicitis in 1933, aged 20.

References

1906 births
2000 deaths
German male cyclists
Sportspeople from Duisburg
Cyclists from North Rhine-Westphalia
20th-century German people